This article lists the various etymologies (origins) of the names of rivers around the world.

Africa
Apies: from Afrikaans meaning "little apes".
Berg: from Afrikaans meaning "mountain".
Blood: from the Battle of Blood River, where 600 voortrekkers fought off 20,000 attacking Zulu troops. No voortrekkers were killed, but the dead Zulus (3,000 died) stained the nearby river with blood, and so the name stayed.
Breede: from Afrikaans meaning "wide".
Escravos: from Portuguese meaning "slaves".
Forcados: from Portuguese meaning "forked".
Gamtoos: probably derived from a Khoikhoi clan whose name was given by early Dutch settlers as "Gamtousch".
Komati: from siSwati meaning "cow".
Liesbeek: named after a small river in the Netherlands.
Modder: from Afrikaans meaning "mud".
Mooi River (KwaZulu-Natal) and Mooi River (Vaal): from Afrikaans meaning "beautiful".
Niger: from the Tuareg phrase gher n gheren meaning "river of rivers", shortened to ngher.
Nile: from Greek Neilos (Νεῖλος), sometimes derived from the Semitic Nahal "river."
Nossob: from Khoikhoi meaning "black river".
Ohlanga: from Zulu meaning "reed".
Olifants: from Afrikaans meaning "elephants".
Omi Osun: from Yoruba meaning "waters of the spirit-goddess Ọṣun".
Orange: from Afrikaans "Oranje", meaning Orange, which was named after William V, Prince of Orange.
Palala: from Sotho meaning "one that inundates".
Vaal: from Afrikaans meaning "dull".

Antarctica
Alph River: name is from the opening passage in Samuel Taylor Coleridge's poem, Kubla Khan
Onyx River: so named because of the relationship of the 15th, 14th, 25th and 24th letters of the alphabet in Onyx

Asia
Amur: Mongolian "rest"
Angara: Buryat angarkhai "the mouth of a wild beast"
Aravand-rud: Persian "fast river"
Brahmaputra: Sanskrit "son of Brahma"
Chao Phraya: Thai เจ้าพระยา "river of kings"
Dongjiang: Chinese "east river" (東江)
Ganges: Sanskrit Ganga
Indus River: Sanskrit Sindhu generically means "river, stream, ocean"
Jordan River: Hebrew Yarden, Arabic Urdunn from the root .י.ר.ד‎ / وَرَدَ‎ meaning "to go down".
Mekong: Thai Mae Khong (แม่ โขง), "mother of all rivers"
Ob: Komi "snow, snowdrift, place of snow"
Pearl River: from Chinese 珠江 (Mandarin: Zhu Jiang; Cantonese: Zyü Gong) named after a sandy or stony island in the middle of the river called "Sea Pearl" (now reduced to a bank in the river)
Satule: Red River
Sefid-rud: Persian "White river"
Selenge: Mongolian "for swimming"
Tigris River: Sumerian "running water"
Wang Thong: From Thai วังทอง, "Gold Palace"
Chang Jiang: Chinese "long river" (長江), from jiang 江 (Old Chinese: kˁrong), argued to be from earlier Proto-Austroasiatic *krung "river"?
Yellow River (Huang He): Chinese "yellow river" (黄河), from he 河 (Old Chinese: ɡˁaj), "river"

Australia
Barwon River (New South Wales): Ngiyampaa paawan, meaning "river"
Burnett River: named by James Burnett, explorer
Campaspe River: named for Campaspe, a mistress of Alexander the Great
Cooper Creek: named for Charles Cooper, Chief Justice of South Australia 1856–1861
Daintree River: named for Richard Daintree, geologist
Daly River: named for Sir Dominick Daly, Governor of South Australia 1862–1868
Darling River: named for Sir Ralph Darling, Governor of New South Wales 1825–1831
Diamantina River: named for Lady Diamantina Bowen, wife of the first Governor of Queensland
Flinders River: named for Captain Matthew Flinders, explorer
Franklin River: named for Sir John Franklin, Governor of Tasmania 1836–1843
Gascoyne River: named for Captain J. Gascoyne, friend of explorer Lieutenant George Grey
Goulburn River (New South Wales): named for Henry Goulburn, English statesman
Hawkesbury River: named for Charles Jenkinson, 1st Earl of Liverpool (titled Baron Hawkesbury in 1789)
Lachlan River: named for Major-General Lachlan Macquarie, Governor of New South Wales 1810–1821
Macquarie River: named for Major-General Lachlan Macquarie, Governor of New South Wales 1810–1821
Murray River: named for Sir George Murray, then British Secretary of State for War and the Colonies
Murrumbidgee River: from Wiradjuri, meaning "big water"
Ord River: named for Harry Ord, Governor of Western Australia 1877–1880
River Torrens: named for Colonel Robert Torrens, chairman of South Australia's colonising commission
Rufus River: named by explorer Charles Sturt for the nickname of his travelling companion (Rufus), the red-haired George Macleay
Todd River: named for Charles Todd, Postmaster-General of South Australia 1870–1901
Waikato River: from Māori, meaning "flowing water"
Yarra River: mistranslation from Wurundjeri term yarra yarra

Europe

Aboño. From Celtic *abon- 'river': OIr. ab, aub, MW afon, MBret auon, (PIE: *h2ep-h3on- 'river'). 
Argeş: from Greek or maybe Thracian arges = "bright"
Avon. From Celtic *abon- 'river': OIr. ab, aub, MW afon, MBret auon, (PIE: *h2ep-h3on- 'river').
Avonbeg: Irish meaning "small river"
Avonmore: Irish meaning "big river"
Awbeg: Irish meaning "small river"
Bistriţa: Slavic "bistra" = "fast, quick"
Bosna: likely from the Illyrian Bosona = "flowing water". Eponymous of Bosnia.
Boyne: Irish river goddess Boann, "white cow"
Cam: from Celtic kambo 'bend, coocked', Brythonic cam "crooked"
Caraş: Turkish "kara" = "black", "dark"
Clanrye: Irish meaning "harbour of the king"
Clwyd: Welsh meaning "hurdle"
Danube: Latin Danuvius, Dacian: Donaris, from Iranian (Scythian or Sarmatian) dānu- 'river', of Indo-European origin
Dnieper: from Old East Slavic  (Dŭněprŭ), with further origins disputed
Dobra: from Celtic *dubro 'dark':  MIr. dobur 'black, unclean', MW dwfr 'water', MBret. dour (PIE *deubh-).
Drave: in Latin "Dravus", of Thracian or Illyrian origin, probably from PIE *dhreu = "to flow, to fall".
Don (Aberdeenshire, Scotland): from Celtic Devona 'goddess'
 Ialomiţa: Slavic "jalov" = "infertile"
 Prahova: Slavic "prag"="waterfall" or "prah"="dust"
 Siret: ancient Thracian "Seretos", probably from PIE *sreu = "to flow"
Emajõgi: Estonian meaning "mother river"
Erne: Irish after the name of the mythical princess, Éirne
Foyle: Irish meaning "estuary of the lip"
Guadalquivir: from the Arabic wadi al-kabir, or "great river"
Hayle: from Cornish Heyl "estuary"
Kymijoki: Old Finnish for kymi, "huge river"
Lagan: Irish meaning "river of the low-lying district"
Llobregat: from Latin Rubricatus "red river"
Mersey: Anglo Saxon meaning "boundary river"
Narva: Veps after "rapid" or "falls"
Quoile: Irish meaning "the narrow"
Rhine: from the archaic German Rhine, which in turn comes from Middle High German: Rin, from the Proto-Indo-European root *reie- ("to flow, run").
The Reno River in Italy shares the same etymology.
Severn: Latin "Sabrina" from an Old British river goddess of that name, becoming "Hafren" in modern Welsh
Shannon: Irish Sionann, name of a river goddess, Old Irish Sinann, from sen 'old, ancient'
Slaney: Irish meaning "river of health"
River Tay: Celtic river goddess Tawa (Tava, Tatha, "the silent one") 
Tambre (river). From Tamaris with the same root that Tamar.
Thames: Latin "Tamesis" from Brythonic meaning "dark river"
The River Thame and River Tamar, and probably the three rivers called River Tame, have a similar etymological root
Tyne: Brythonic meaning "river"
Torne älv: Likely of Finnish origin, meaning "spear"
Volga River: Slavic влага "vlaga", волога "vologa" meaning "wetness", "humidity"; alternatively, Proto-Uralic *valki- "white"; alternatively, Russian velikij "great"
Wear: Brythonic meaning "water"

North America
Athabasca: From the Woods Cree word aðapaskāw, "[where] there are plants one after another".
Bow: After the reeds growing along its banks, which were used by the local Indians to make bows.
Brazos: From the Spanish Los Brazos de Dios, or "the arms of God". There are several different explanations for the name, all involving it being the first water to be found by desperately thirsty parties.
Canadian River: The etymology is unclear. The name may have come from French-Canadian traders and hunters who traveled along the river, or early explorers may have thought that the river flowed into Canada.
Chattahoochee: from Creek cato hocce "marked rock".
Colorado: Spanish for "red-colored; reddish."
Columbia: Named for Captain Robert Gray's ship Columbia Rediviva, the first to travel up the river.
Cumberland: Named for Prince William Augustus, Duke of Cumberland.
Delaware: After the Bay, named for Thomas West, Baron De la Warre, first English colonial governor of Virginia.
Fraser: Named for Simon Fraser, who confirmed it was a separate river from the Columbia.
Hackensack: probably from Unami Delaware ahkinkèshaki, "place of sharp ground".
Hiwassee: from the Cherokee meaning "stone wall", or from an Eastern Algonquian language meaning "beyond the hill" (e.g., Abenaki awasadenek).
Hudson: named for Henry Hudson, an Englishman sailing for the Netherlands, who explored it in 1609.
Loup: French for "wolf", after the Pawnee "wolf people" (Skidi band).
Mackenzie: After Alexander MacKenzie, the Scots-Canadian explorer.
Mississagi: Ojibwe misi-zaagi, "river with a wide mouth".
Mississippi: Ojibwe misi-ziibi, "big river".
Missouri: Named for the Missouri Indians, who lived along the banks. Their name comes from the Illinois mihsoori, meaning "dugout canoe".
Nelson: Named for Robert Nelson, a ship's master who died at the mouth of the river in 1612.
Ottawa: Named for the Ottawa people, a community of the Algonquian nation, who lived along the river until 1685.
Peace: After Peace Point, the location of the ratification of the Treaty of the Peace.
Platte: French Rivière Plate ("Flat River"), a calque of the Chiwere name ñįbraske ("flattened water").
Potomac: From the Patowamek tribe noted by Captain John Smith.
Republican: Named for the Pawnee band known as "the Republicans".
Rio Grande: Spanish for "big river".
Saint-Laurent: French for Saint Lawrence.
Saskatchewan: From the Cree term Cree kisiskāciwani-sīpiy, meaning "swift flowing river".
Schuylkill: from the Dutch schuil and kil, meaning "hidden river".
Snake River: Derived from an S-shaped gesture the Shoshone made with their hands to represent swimming salmon. Explorers misinterpreted it to represent a snake, giving the river its present-day name.
Stanislaus: named after Estanislao
Susquehanna: Named after the Susquehannock Indians, whose name derives from an Algonquian word meaning "people at the falls", "roily water people", or "muddy current".
Tennessee: Named for the Cherokee town of Tanasi, whose etymology is unknown.
Wabash: English spelling of French Ouabache, from Miami-Illinois waapaahšiiki, "it shines white".
Yukon: from an Athabaskan language (e.g., Koyukon yookkene, Lower Tanana yookuna).

South America
Amazon River: Greek (after the Amazons) alt. Indian (from Amassona 'boat destroyer')
Río Calle-Calle: Mapudungun for "lot of Iridaceaes"
Río Cochrane: after Lord Cochrane who served in the Chilean Navy
Río Futaleufú: Mapudungun for "big river"
Río Ibañez: after Carlos Ibáñez del Campo former president of Chile
Río Imperial: after the old city of Carahue, formerly known as Imperial.
Paraná River: Guarani "Copious River"
Río de la Plata: Spanish for "Silver River"
Rio Roosevelt (sometimes Rio Teodoro): after Theodore Roosevelt
Río Valdivia: after the Spanish conquistador of Chile Pedro de Valdivia

See also
 Hydronymy
 Lists of etymologies
 Toponomy

References

Bibliography
Bright, William (2004). Native American Place Names of the United States. Norman: University of Oklahoma Press
 Blažek, Václav, and Ondřej Šefčík. "Oronyms Derived from Water? Mons Abnobae and Haraitī". Historische Sprachforschung [Historical Linguistics] 124 (2011): 239–49. http://www.jstor.org/stable/41553574.
 Hamp, Eric P. ""Water" in Italic and Keltic". In: Etudes Celtiques, vol. 12, fascicule 2, 1970. pp. 547–550. DOI: https://doi.org/10.3406/ecelt.1970.1436 ; www.persee.fr/doc/ecelt_0373-1928_1970_num_12_2_1436

Name
River names
Hydronymy

pt:Hidrônimo